Roman Sadovsky (born May 31, 1999) is a Canadian figure skater and YouTuber. Representing Canada, he competed at the 2022 Winter Olympics. He is the 2019 NHK Trophy bronze medallist, the 2018 CS Alpen Trophy silver medallist, the 2022 CS Nebelhorn Trophy bronze medalist, the 2020 Canadian national champion, and the 2022 Canadian national silver medallist.

On the junior level, he is the 2014 JGP Czech Republic champion, the 2015 JGP Slovakia champion, the 2016 JGP Estonia silver medallist, and placed 4th at the 2016 Winter Youth Olympics.

Personal life 
Sadovsky was born on May 31, 1999, in Toronto, Ontario, Canada. His parents moved to Canada from Ukraine. His idol is Jeffrey Buttle, whom he credits as being the most important inspiration in his skating career; as a boy, Sadovsky wanted to emulate Buttle's skating style. After attending Christ The King CES, he continued his education at Bill Crothers Secondary School.

Career

Early years 
Sadovsky began learning to skate at the age of five years to play hockey. Tracey Wainman started coaching him when he was eight. Another early coach was Allen Carson.

2012–2013 season
Making his Junior Grand Prix debut, Sadovsky won a bronze medal in Lake Placid, New York, and placed tenth in Bled, Slovenia. He withdrew from the 2013 Canadian Championships due to a metatarsal fracture in his right foot on a growth plate near the toe.

2013–2014 season
Coached by Tracey Wainman and Grzegorz Filipowski at the York Region Skating Academy in Richmond Hill, Ontario, Sadovsky competed in two events of the 2013 Junior Grand Prix series, placing fourteenth in Riga, Latvia, and eighth in Minsk, Belarus. Nationally, he appeared on the senior level, finishing eighth at the 2014 Canadian Championships. He was selected for the 2014 World Junior Championships in Sofia, Bulgaria. Ranked fourteenth in the short program and twelfth in the free skate, he finished thirteenth overall.

2014–2015 season
Sadovsky's first assignment of the 2014 Junior Grand Prix series was in Ostrava, Czech Republic. Ranked first in the short program and third in the free skate, he finished first overall by a margin of 3.39 points over the silver medalist, Alexander Samarin. After the event, Sadovsky said his goal was to develop a solid triple Axel. He then went on to place fourth at his second JGP event in Dresden, Germany. With those results, Sadovsky qualified for the 2014 JGP Final and placed fifth.

At the 2015 Canadian Championships, Sadovsky placed fourth. He ended his season with a fourteenth-place finish at the 2015 World Junior Championships.

2015–2016 season
In the 2015 Junior Grand Prix season, Sadovsky was assigned to the first event, held in Bratislava, Slovakia. With a quad Salchow in the free skate — Sadovsky's first quad in competition — he won the gold medal with a total score 2.87 points ahead of Vincent Zhou of the United States. He then went on to win bronze at his second JGP event, in Toruń, Poland. These results qualified him for the 2015 JGP Final, where he was sixth. He represented Canada at the 2016 Winter Youth Olympics and finished fourth. He was coached by Wainman and Filipowski.

2016–2017 season
Sadovsky changed coaches, joining Brian Orser and Lee Barkell at the Toronto Cricket, Skating and Curling Club. He placed ninth at the 2017 Canadian Championships. Ranked ninth in the short program and twenty-third in the free skate, he finished seventeenth at the 2017 World Junior Championships in Taipei, Taiwan.

2017–2018 season
Sadovsky switched back to Wainman and Filipowski. Making his Grand Prix debut, he placed tenth at the 2017 Skate America. He finished seventh at the 2018 Canadian Championships.

2018–2019 season
Sadovsky began the season at the 2018 CS Autumn Classic International, where he placed fourth in both the short and free programs, winning the bronze medal, his first senior medal.  Sadovsky landed his first quad toe loop jump in competition.  He then placed twelfth at the 2018 Skate Canada International, after struggling in both of his programs, and won the silver medal at the 2018 Inge Solar Memorial.

Sadovsky placed fifth in the short program at the 2019 Canadian Championships, executing his open quadruple Salchow-triple toe loop combination cleanly but popping a planned quad toe loop and receiving a negative Grade of Execution on his triple Axel.  He dropped to seventh place overall following a difficult free skate.

2019–2020 season
Starting the season on the Challenger series, Sadovsky won the bronze medal at the 2019 CS Finlandia Trophy after placing third in the short program and fourth in the free skate.

Sadovsky placed tenth at Skate Canada International, his first Grand Prix assignment for the season.  Competing next at the 2019 NHK Trophy, Sadovsky placed fourth in the short program despite making two jump errors, one of them costing him the second part of his combination. He was second in the free skate, making only two minor errors on his second triple Axel and closing triple Lutz, and placed third overall, taking his first ever Grand Prix medal.

Entering the 2020 Canadian Championships as a contender for the title, Sadovsky placed third in the short program behind Keegan Messing and Nam Nguyen, having had two of his jumps called as underrotated.  He then won the free skate, with only two minor jump errors on his triple loop and second triple Axel, while Messing and Nguyen both struggled.  Sadovsky won his first national title by a margin of over seventeen points.  Sadovsky was named to one of Canada's three men's berths at the 2020 Four Continents Championships, but Skate Canada declined to immediately decide who would be Canada's sole men's representative at the 2020 World Championships in Montreal.  Sadovsky placed sixteenth at Four Continents, and thus was not chosen for the World Championships, instead claimed by Nguyen.

2020–2021 season 
Sadovsky was assigned to compete at the 2020 Skate Canada International, but the event was cancelled as a result of the coronavirus pandemic.

On November 9, Sadovsky revealed the choreography for his free program to "Chasing Cars" by the Irish band Snow Patrol, which was uploaded to his YouTube channel.

With the pandemic making it difficult to hold in-person events, the 2021 Skate Canada Challenge, the main qualifying competition for the national championships, was held virtually.  Sadovsky placed first in both the short program and the free skate, taking the gold medal over Nam Nguyen by a margin of 5.58 points.  Due to the cancellation of the 2021 Canadian Championships, many called this a de facto national title.

Sadovsky was named as an alternate to the 2021 World Championships, the lone men's berth going to Keegan Messing. With Canada's mandatory two-week quarantine for returning athletes, however, no member of the World team was assigned to the 2021 World Team Trophy, and Sadovsky was assigned as one of Canada's two men's entries, alongside Nguyen. Sadovsky placed sixth in the short program at World Team Trophy, setting a new personal best, but was tenth of eleven skaters in the free skate.  Team Canada finished in sixth place.

2021–2022 season 
In the leadup to the 2022 Winter Olympics, Sadovsky was assigned to the 2021 CS Nebelhorn Trophy to qualify a second Olympic berth for Canadian men following the results of the 2021 World Championships earlier in the year. Sadovsky placed eighth in the event after struggling with his jumps in both segments but managed to secure the seventh of seven available spots. He remarked afterward that "mentally, I thought it would be better. My training was really good, my practices and warm-up were excellent. But the moment the music is turned on, it changes."  

On the Grand Prix at the 2021 Skate Canada International, Sadovsky placed twelfth of twelve skaters. He significantly improved at this second event, the 2021 Rostelecom Cup, where he placed fourth with new personal bests in the free skate and total score. He remarked he was "very, very pleased" with the results after early struggles.

Sadovsky placed fourth in the short program at the 2022 Canadian Championships after failing to execute a jump combination. He placed second in the free skate, his only notable error being a doubled attempt at a triple Lutz, taking the silver medal. On January 9 he was named to the Canadian Olympic team alongside Keegan Messing.

Messing was originally meant to be the Canadian entry in the men's short program of the Olympic team event, but after positive COVID-19 tests, he was unable to travel to China in time, with the task falling to Sadovsky as a result. He performed poorly in the short program, placing eighth of nine skaters and securing three points for Canada. Canada ultimately qualified for the second phase of the competition, with Sadovsky also skating the free segment. Making numerous jump errors, he finished last in the segment and described his performance as "really shaky” and that it felt like he was in “somebody else’s body." He expressed hope that he could "use this opportunity to find that comfort in the singles event." Team Canada finished fourth overall. Sadovsky fared no better in the men's event, making errors on all three jump attempts and finishing twenty-ninth and last in the short program, failing to qualify for the free skate.

Sadovsky concluded his season at the 2022 World Championships in a men's field considerably more open than usual due to the absences of Nathan Chen and Yuzuru Hanyu and the International Skating Union banning all Russian athletes due to their country's invasion of Ukraine. Eighteenth in the short program, he delivered a strong free skate and came ninth in that segment, rising to twelfth overall. Sadovsky later revealed that he had suffered a strained hip flexor after falling on the triple Axel in his short program but was able to work through it on his day off and compete in the free skate.

2022–2023 season
Sadovsky intended to skate to "Fix You" by Coldplay for his free program this season. However, he dropped the program after High Performance Camp. He then returned to his old program of "Chasing Cars" by Snow Patrol, with which he competed at the 2022 CS Nebelhorn Trophy. Sadovsky placed first in the short program with a clean skate but dropped to the bronze medal position after the free skate, which he said: "wasn't quite what I wanted." He shared the Fritz Geiger Memorial Trophy with the rest of the Canadian delegation, awarded to the top country at the competition.

On the Grand Prix, Sadovsky's first event was the 2022 Skate America, where he finished in fifth place after debuting a new free program to "Angels" by Robbie Williams. He called his performance "an improvement from my last competition" overall. At his second event, the 2022 MK John Wilson Trophy, Sadovsky finished first in the short program with a score just slightly off his personal best, despite putting his free foot down on the landing of his jump combination. However, he made several errors in the free skate, finishing eighth in that segment and dropping to sixth overall.

Sadovsky's season finished on a disappointing note at the 2023 Canadian Championships, where he placed eighth after two error-strewn programs.

Programs

Competitive highlights 
GP: Grand Prix; CS: Challenger Series; JGP: Junior Grand Prix

Detailed results
Small medals for short and free programs awarded only at ISU Championships. At team events, medals awarded for team results only.

References

External links 

 

1999 births
Canadian male single skaters
Canadian people of Ukrainian descent
Figure skaters at the 2016 Winter Youth Olympics
Figure skaters at the 2022 Winter Olympics
Figure skaters from Toronto
Living people
Olympic figure skaters of Canada